Hans Nilson Langseth (July 14, 1846 – November 10, 1927) was a Norwegian-American who held the record for the world's longest beard.

Langseth was born in Eidsvoll in 1846 and immigrated to the United States in 1867. He married Anna Berntsen in 1870 and worked as a farmer in Elkton Township, Clay County, Minnesota. Later on in his life, he began growing a beard as part of a contest, and he won the contest. In his later life, he traveled around the United States as part of a freak show showing off his beard.

Langseth died aged 81 in Wyndmere, North Dakota, and is buried in Elk Creek Church Cemetery in Kensett, Iowa. When he died, his beard measured . It was donated to the Department of Anthropology at the Smithsonian Institution in 1967.

See also
Hans Staininger

References

External links
Geiling, Natasha. 2014. The World's Longest Beard Is One of the Smithsonian's Strangest Artifacts. Smithsonian (November 19).

People from Eidsvoll
American circus performers
1846 births
1927 deaths
19th-century circus performers
20th-century circus performers